R.O.T.O.R. (also known as Blue Steel and R.O.T.O.R.: Police Force) is a 1987 American science fiction action film starring Richard Gesswein, Jayne Smith and Margaret Trigg. The film has been described as a low-budget copy of The Terminator and RoboCop with some elements taken from Judge Dredd.

The film is well known in Argentina as the origin of the name of the Argentinian rock band Él Mató a un Policía Motorizado (He killed a motorcycle cop).

Plot
Scientist and police captain Dr. Barrett C. Coldyron develops a prototype police robot he dubs R.O.T.O.R. (for "Robotic Officer Tactical Operations Research/Reserve") as part of his vision for preserving peace in a chaotic future. He is pressured by his superior, the corrupt Division Commander Earl Buglar, to rush R.O.T.O.R.'s development so Senator Donald Douglas, the project's financial sponsor, can use it to campaign for President. Coldyron refuses Buglar's demands to have R.O.T.O.R. ready in sixty days and resigns rather than be fired, leaving control of the project in the hands of his incompetent assistants, Dr. Houghtaling and his robot Willard.

Following Coldyron's departure, a lab accident results in R.O.T.O.R. activating and going out on duty. While on patrol, it stops a motorist for speeding and, not yet having higher brain functions in its programming, executes him. His fiancée, Sonya, becomes R.O.T.O.R.'s target as it views her as her boyfriend's accomplice, and the robot begins a relentless pursuit of her. Coldyron learns of the murder and discovers R.O.T.O.R.'s activation, finding that it is operating under its prime directive, "to judge and execute". He saves Sonya from R.O.T.O.R. at a gas station and helps her escape, informing her that the robot will continue to pursue her and thus she must keep moving. Devising a plan to stop R.O.T.O.R.'s rampage, Coldyron contacts Dr. Corrine Steele, who developed the robot's combat chassis from a unique, self-teaching alloy, for assistance. They realize that as long as R.O.T.O.R. remains pursuing Sonya, it will not kill anyone else who does not get in its way.

On Coldyron's instruction, Sonya leads R.O.T.O.R. to a fishing camp. Coldyron and Steele arrive soon after, and Steele sacrifices herself to rip open R.O.T.O.R.'s chest, exposing its power core. Coldyron manages to lasso R.O.T.O.R.'s limbs with Primacord ropes to restrain it, and R.O.T.O.R.'s electrical discharge detonates the explosives, finally destroying the robot for good.

Coldyron files a final report on the incident and leaves the police building. However, he is ambushed outside by Buglar, who murders him to cover up the corruption and embezzlement involved in funding the project. His nephew, Brett Coldyron, subsequently inherits his research and money. Brett, deciding to continue and perfect his uncle's work, creates a new R.O.T.O.R. model, upgraded to include the higher brain functions that will make it capable of mercy and modeled in Dr. Steele's physical image.

Cast 
 Richard Gesswein as Captain Barrett C. Coldyron, a scientist who runs the police robotics lab and also manages a ranch. Coldyron's dream of a force of robotic officers is shattered by Earl G. Buglar.
 Jayne Smith as Dr. Corrine R. Steele, the designer of R.O.T.O.R.'s robotic chassis. 
 Smith also portrays R.O.T.O.R. II, an upgraded R.O.T.O.R. modeled after Steele that appears in the final scene.
 Carroll Brandon Baker as R.O.T.O.R., the killer robot that is accidentally activated. It is a dangerous machine that is adept at everything from t'ai chi to full field combat, and can visualize past events in an area by removing its sunglasses. It is built of a new alloy capable of self-teaching, but has one known weakness: loud noises immobilize it.
 Michael Hunter as Earl G. Buglar, Coldyron's commander in the police department. Buglar has been embezzling money from the R.O.T.O.R. project and has promised a corrupt senator, Donald D. Douglas, that the robot will be ready in time for the next election. 
 Margaret Trigg as Sonya R. "Sony" Garren, an innocent woman who is stalked by R.O.T.O.R. after it kills her fiancé for speeding. Sonya spends much of the movie fleeing from R.O.T.O.R. in her blue 1986 Impulse while Coldyron and Steele work to develop a plan for defeating R.O.T.O.R.
 Shawn Brown as Mokie Killion, a hard-bitten sarcastic cop. Mokie does not like cleaning up the messes left behind when Coldyron stops group of armed shoplifters.
 Clark Moore as Dr. Houghtaling, Coldyron's laboratory assistant. He is placed in charge of the R.O.T.O.R. project by Buglar following Coldyron's resignation, and his incompetence soon leads to the cyborg's rampage.
 Willard the Robot as Willard, Dr. Houghtaling's robotic aide. Despite being far less advanced than R.O.T.O.R., Willard has a fully formed personality and behaves in human-like ways, such as reading magazines and asking Houghtaling to share his French fries. Willard often serves as a voice of reason to the humans around him, providing sarcastic comments on their actions.
 Nanette Kuczek as Penny Gayle, Coldyron's girlfriend.
 Quintin Hardtner as Brett Coldyron, Coldyron's nephew.

The film features extensive voice-over, with Loren Bivens voicing Coldyron, Georganna Barry voicing Steele, and additional voices provided by Rocky Patterson, Mike Collins, Patrick Montes, Jo Brewer and Lawrence Morgan.

Home media
R.O.T.O.R. was released on home video in the United Kingdom by RCA/Columbia in June 1988.

Mill Creek Entertainment included R.O.T.O.R. in their "Sci-Fi Invasion 50 Movie" DVD boxed set in 2011.

In October 2014, RiffTrax released R.O.T.O.R. as a video-on-demand title with humorous commentary.

In February 2016, the film was released on Blu-ray by Shout! Factory in a double feature with Millennium.

References

Footnotes

Sources

External links
 
 
 
 Review of R.O.T.O.R.
 RiffTrax treatment on official YouTube channel

1980s science fiction action films
1987 films
American independent films
American science fiction action films
Android (robot) films
1980s English-language films
Films set in Texas
Films shot in Texas
1980s rediscovered films
Rediscovered American films
1980s American films